Soldier of God  is a 2005 American historical film directed by W.D. Hogan and starring Tim Abell.

Plot
A Knights Templar meets a mysterious Muslim in the desert. They find refuge in an oasis at home of a beautiful woman. As the Knight falls for the woman and the simple life, he questions his Crusader ethos. But the Muslim holds a secret that will be bring devastation and change their lives for ever.

Reception
The Mediavalists reviewed the film, stating: "Soldier of God is a relatively low budget production, but it doesn’t come across as cheap, or suffer as a result of its financial limitations. Most of the actors in this movie aren’t well known in terms of Hollywood star-power, but that’s irrelevant; the acting is solid and engaging."

Cast
 Tim Abell as Rene
 Bill Mendieta as Hasan
 Mapi Galán as Soheila
 Nicholas Kadi as Omar
 Scott Cleverdon as Geoffrey
 Michael Desante as Yaqut
 William Morgan Sheppard as Raymond of Tripoli
 T. J. Storm as Muslim Champion

References

External links

2005 films
American historical films
2000s historical films
Films set in the 11th century
Films directed by W. D. Hogan
2000s English-language films
2000s American films